The US-China Business Council (USCBC) is a nonprofit organization whose stated goal is promoting trade between the United States and China. It comprises around 200 American companies that trade and do business with China.

History
The council was founded in 1973 with the support of the White House, the Department of State and the Department of Commerce as the National Council for United States-China Trade. Frederick B. Dent, the then United States Secretary of Commerce, compiled an executive committee for the council out of several prominent business leaders.

The executive committee first met on March 22, 1973, to begin the formation of the council, with the executive committee members being the first Board of Directors. Donald C. Burnham, of Westinghouse Corporation, took the post of chairman and the Board elected Christopher H. Phillips to be the first president. Phillips would serve as president of the council until his retirement in 1986.

In the first year, the Council attracted 200 members and, by 1982, this had grown to 400 members. In 1974, the council began the publishing of the China Business Review, a journal aimed at American companies trying to enter the Chinese market and in 1979, the Council opened an office in Beijing.

Activities 
A 2021 report by the Foundation for Defense of Democracies identified USCBC as a key facilitator of Beijing's efforts to carry out its campaign of subnational influence in and against the United States.

In 2022, the US-China Business Council lobbied against legislation to screen of outbound U.S. investments for potential national security issues. The council has also expressed concern about the implementation of the Uyghur Forced Labor Prevention Act.

Member companies
The council has many member companies including 3M, Adobe Systems Inc., Apple Inc., Amazon, Bank of America, Coca-Cola, The Walt Disney Company, Gap Inc. and Walmart.

See also
China–United States relations
United States-China Economic and Security Review Commission

References

External links 

 

China–United States relations
China–United States economic relations